The 2020 Ukrainian Super Cup was the 17th edition of Ukrainian Super Cup, an annual season opener football match contested by the previous season's Ukrainian Premier League champions Shakhtar Donetsk and Ukrainian Cup winners Dynamo Kyiv.

The game was scheduled to be played later than usual due to the COVID-19 pandemic. Also while traditionally being held in Odesa, this season it was scheduled to take place in Kyiv at the Olimpiyskiy National Sports Complex on 25 August 2020. The game was played after Round 1 of the 2020–21 Ukrainian Premier League.

Preparations and other background events
For this game the official sponsor was announced TM Waissburg, the official football for the ninth time became the Danish "Select" (Select Sport) and as a television broadcasting partner became Ukrainian television channels "TRK Ukraína" and "Futbol 1/2/3" (both part of Media Group Ukraína).

This game is the first, in which Mircea Lucescu who spent in Shakhtar Donetsk a dozen of years and one of the two original head coaches who participated in the tournament back in 2004 will be leading the chief opponents of the Donetsk club. Anatoliy Demianenko commenting on the game stated that the main intrigue is Lucescu versus Shakhtar. The former players of Shakhtar Artem Fedetskyi and Oleksiy Hai commenting on the game agree that it is unusual game, but Shakhtar shall still win. The head coach of Shakhtar Luís Castro is eager to win the Super Cup which slipped away the last season. Castro is sure that both clubs will field their best squads for the game and Lucescu will be requesting the maximum from his. Another Ukrainian head coach Myron Markevych thinks that the game does not matter and the main task for the teams is to qualify for the European competitions.

The game is expected to kick off the next day after the national holiday Independence Day of Ukraine.

The refereeing team led by Romanov partially preserved from the last year will be supervised by Luciano Luci, while VAR operations will be supervised by Serhiy Lysenchuk.

Previous encounters 

Before this game both teams met in the Ukrainian Super Cup twelve (12) times, the first being back in 2004. Before this game out of the previous twelve Dynamo won 4 games and Shakhtar won 3, five more games were tied and led to penalty shootout three of which were won by Dynamo and two were won by Shakhtar.

Comparison table

Match

Details

Notes

References

External links
 The official pamphlet of the 2020 Ukrainian Super Cup (Офіційна програма Суперкубка України 2020). Ukrainian Premier League. 25 August 2020. (32 pages)

2020
2020–21 in Ukrainian football
FC Dynamo Kyiv matches
FC Shakhtar Donetsk matches
Sports competitions in Kyiv
August 2020 sports events in Europe
Ukrainian Super Cup, 2020